Jacob Bronowski (18 January 1908 – 22 August 1974) was a Polish-British mathematician and philosopher. He was known to friends and professional colleagues alike by the nickname Bruno. He is best known for developing a humanistic approach to science, and as the presenter and writer of the thirteen-part 1973 BBC television documentary series, and accompanying book The Ascent of Man, which led to his regard as "one of the world's most celebrated intellectuals".

Bronowski's family moved from Congress Poland to Germany and then to England while he was a child. He won a scholarship to study mathematics at the University of Cambridge. His interests have been described as ranging "widely, from biology to poetry and from chess to Humanism". He taught mathematics at the University College Hull between 1934 and 1942. During World War II he led the field of operations research and worked to increase the effectiveness of Allied bombing. After the war he headed the projects division of UNESCO. Bronowski wrote poetry and had a deep affinity with William Blake. From 1950 to 1963 he worked for the National Coal Board in the UK. From 1963 he was a resident fellow of the Salk Institute for Biological Studies in San Diego, until his death in 1974 in East Hampton, New York, just a year after the airing of his Ascent of Man.

Early life and education
Jacob Bronowski was born to a Polish-Jewish family in Łódź, Congress Poland, in 1908. His family moved to Germany during the First World War, and to Britain in 1920, Bronowski's parents having been married in Britain in the London house of his maternal grandfather in 1907. Although, according to Bronowski, he knew only two English words on arriving in Britain, he gained admission to the Central Foundation Boys' School in London and went on to study at the University of Cambridge, where he graduated as Senior Wrangler.

As a mathematics student at Jesus College, Cambridge, Bronowski co-edited—with William Empson—the literary periodical Experiment, which first appeared in 1928. Bronowski would pursue this sort of dual activity, in both the mathematical and literary worlds, throughout his professional life. He was also a strong chess player, earning a half-blue while at Cambridge and composing numerous chess problems for the British Chess Magazine between 1926 and 1970. He received a PhD in mathematics at Cambridge in 1935, writing a dissertation in algebraic geometry. For a time in the 1930s he lived near Laura Riding and Robert Graves in Majorca. From 1934 to 1942, he taught mathematics at the University College of Hull. Beginning in this period, the British secret service MI5 placed him under surveillance, believing he was a security risk, which may have restricted his access to senior posts in the UK.

Wartime work in military analysis

During the Second World War, Bronowski worked in operations research for the UK's Ministry of Home Security, where he developed mathematical approaches to bombing strategy for RAF Bomber Command.

At the end of the war, Bronowski was part of a British team of scientists and civil engineers that visited Japan to document the effects of the atomic bombings of Hiroshima and Nagasaki for the purpose of studying the effects of the atomic bomb and its implications for future UK civil defence. Bronowski, in conjunction with Professor W. N. Thomas of Cardiff University, subsequently produced the secret Report of the British Mission to Japan: the Effects of the Atomic Bombs Dropped at Hiroshima and Nagasaki, which was passed to various government departments and consulted in the design of future UK public buildings. It was simultaneously published in the US.

Post-war biological analysis
Following his experiences of the after-effects of the Nagasaki and Hiroshima bombings, he discontinued his work for British military research and turned to biology, as did his friend Leo Szilard, and many other physicists of that time, to better understand the nature of violence. Subsequently, Bronowski became Director of Research for the National Coal Board in the UK, and an associate director of the Salk Institute from 1964.

In 1950, Bronowski was given the Taung Child's fossilised skull and asked to try, using his statistical skills, to combine a measure of the size of the skull's teeth with their shape in order to discriminate them from the teeth of apes. Work on this turned his interests towards the biology of humanity's intellectual products.

Public science education
In 1967 Bronowski delivered the six Silliman Memorial Lectures at Yale University and chose as his subject the role of imagination and symbolic language in the progress of scientific knowledge. Transcripts of the lectures were published posthumously in 1978 as The Origins of Knowledge and Imagination and remain in print. He first became familiar to the British public through appearances on the BBC television version of The Brains Trust in the late 1950s. His ability to answer questions on many varied subjects led to an offhand reference in episode 22 of Monty Python's Flying Circus ("Penguin on the Television Set") where one character states that "He knows everything".

Bronowski is best remembered for his 13-part series The Ascent of Man (1973), a BBC television documentary about the history of human life and scientific endeavour. This project was commissioned by David Attenborough, then Head of BBC2, and was intended to complement two preceding series: art historian Kenneth Clark's "personal view" series Civilisation (1969), which had covered cultural history, and Alistair Cooke's series America: A Personal History of the United States (first broadcast in 1972).

Following the making of The Ascent of Man, Bronowski was interviewed on the chat show Parkinson. Host Michael Parkinson later recounted that Bronowski's description of his visit to Auschwitz, where many of the Polish members of his family had died during the Holocaust, was one of the most memorable parts of any interview he had done. After he had completed the last episode of his show, Parkinson stated: "If I could save one interview from the thousands I have done, it would be the one-man show with Professor Jacob Bronowski."

Personal life
Bronowski married Rita Coblentz in 1941. The couple had four daughters, the eldest being the academic Lisa Jardine and another being the filmmaker Judith Bronowski.

Bronowski spent time interviewing the physicist Leo Szilard for about the last year of the scientist's life. Szilard, who died in mid-1964, had authored the 1939 letter to Franklin D. Roosevelt arguing in favour of pursuing nuclear weapons to ensure victory over the Nazis.

Bronowski died in 1974 of a heart attack in East Hampton, New York, a year after The Ascent of Man was completed, and his ashes were buried in the western side of London's Highgate Cemetery, near the entrance. Rita Bronowski died in California in September 2010, aged 92. The ashes of Lisa Jardine, who died in 2015, were buried on 25 October 2016 next to her father's in Highgate Cemetery.

Books

 The Poet's Defence (1939)
 William Blake: A Man Without a Mask (1943)
 The Common Sense of Science (1951)
 The Face of Violence (1954)
 
 William Blake: The Penguin Poets Series (1958)
 The Western Intellectual Tradition, From Leonardo to Hegel (1960) – with Bruce Mazlish
 Biography of an Atom (1963) – with Millicent Selsam
 Insight (1964)
 
 Nature and Knowledge: The Philosophy of Contemporary Science (1969)
 Atomic Fusion, illustrated by Bartley Powell. Published by Newman Neame Take Home Books Ltd.
 William Blake and the Age of Revolution (1972)
 The Ascent of Man (1974)
 A Sense of the Future (1977)
 Magic, Science & Civilisation (1978)
 The Origins of Knowledge and Imagination (1978)
 The Visionary Eye: Essays in the Arts, Literature and Science (1979) – edited by Piero Ariotti and Rita Bronowski.

References

External links

 
  (includes biography, pictures and obituary).
 The Jacob Bronowski Archive
 The Bronowski Trophy (chess)
 

1908 births
1974 deaths
20th-century British historians
20th-century British poets
20th-century Polish Jews
Academics of the University of Hull
Alumni of Jesus College, Cambridge
British agnostics
British humanists
Burials at Highgate Cemetery
Historians of science
Jewish agnostics
Jewish biologists
Jewish historians
Jewish poets
Jewish scientists
People educated at Central Foundation Boys' School
Polish emigrants to the United Kingdom
Prix Italia winners
Salk Institute for Biological Studies people
Scientists from Łódź
Senior Wranglers
William Blake scholars